"Metalist" Oblast Sports Complex, which includes the Metalist Stadium, is a multi-use stadium in Kharkiv, Ukraine. It is used chiefly for football matches and is the home stadium of FC Metalist 1925 Kharkiv. The stadium, which was a venue for Euro 2012, currently seats 40,003 spectators.

After FC Metalist Kharkiv financially collapsed in May 2016 professional football temporary disappeared from the stadium. In August 2016, Metalist 1925 Kharkiv made the stadium its home stadium. Shakhtar Donetsk followed suit in February 2017.

History

Construction on the stadium began in 1925 by order of Anastas Mikoyan and a decision of the Kharkiv Raion League of Steel Workers (Metalists). Opened on 12 September 1926, the new stadium was known as Traktor, as it was then being built by workers of the Kharkiv Lokomotive Factory (today Malyshev Factory). The stadium was built on territory of an old Holy Spirit cemetery that was active in 1772–1854 and was officially closed by the Russian Holy Synod at the end of the 19th century. On the moment of opening, it was the biggest stadium in the city until in 1931 there was built Dynamo Stadium.

Prior to World War II, the facility was renamed Dzerzhynets Stadium in honor of Felix Dzerzhinsky, the first head of the Cheka. Since 1967, it has borne its present moniker, Metalist; in that same year, the capacity of the stadium reached 10,000.

Including improvements for Euro 2012, the stadium has undergone four renovations over the course of its history. The first of these took place in the mid-1960s, when the western section of the structure was renovated. The next, begun in 1970 and finished four years later, saw the addition of the north and south stands, raising capacity to 30,000. The architect for the project was Yu. Tabakova. Also added were the stadium's first roof and drainage system, as well as floodlighting, an information panel, and a hotel, located under the north stand and gymnasium.

A third renovation was begun in 1979 to renovate the East and South stands but was completed only three decades later. After the demolition of the South Stand in that year, construction was halted indefinitely, resuming only in 1998 after a delay of nearly twenty years. A new East Stand and a partially reconstructed South Stand were erected.

Metalist's fourth set of renovations was ordered in preparation for Euro 2012. The South Stand was completed and a completely new East Stand was built. Roof replacement, other general modernizations and aesthetic improvements were completed by the end of 2009. On 5 December 2009, the renovated stadium was officially opened on the 50th birthday of Metalist Kharkiv's President, Oleksandr Yaroslavsky.

The South Stand contains a three-story shopping mall - business center "Metalist-Arena". The offices are rented here by UkrSibbank, several local businesses, and other banks. There is a pharmacy, a medical office, tour agencies, and other businesses.

On 19 December 2010, the Kharkiv City Council asked the Kharkiv Oblast Council to transfer the Metalist Stadium to the municipal ownership of the city. The then new owner of Metalist Serhiy Kurchenko proposed late December 2012 to buy Kharkiv municipal authorities' share in the Metalist Stadium. He did so in August 2013; from then (technically) the stadium owner is Metalist Stadium Sports Complex LLC, which is part of Metalist which is owned by Kurchenko.

After having finished the 2015–2016 Ukrainian Premier League season, Metalist Kharkiv ceased operating due to insolvency.

In August 2016, Metalist 1925 made the stadium its home ground.

Following the winter break of the 2016–17 season, Shakhtar Donetsk moved to the Metalist Stadium (150 miles to the north of Donetsk) in early 2017. Due to the Russo-Ukrainian War, this club cannot play in its actual home, Donbass Arena.

UEFA Euro 2012 matches
The stadium was one of the venues for the UEFA Euro 2012. The three group B matches involving Netherlands were played there (with the other matches in that group played at Arena Lviv).

The following matches were played at the stadium during UEFA Euro 2012:

See also

 KhTZ Stadium
 Dynamo Stadium (Kharkiv)

References

External links

Google Virtual Tour
Virtual tour of the stadium Metalist
WebCams
The stadium's history (История стадиона). FC Metalist Kharkiv.
Today is 87 years to the Metalist Stadium (Сегодня - 87 лет стадиону Металлист). Metalist.ua
Metalist Stadium (Стадион «Металлист»). My Kharkov portal.
 Senkiv, A. ''How comfortable is to attend the UPL games: Metalist Stadium (Наскільки комфортно ходити на матчі УПЛ: стадіон "Металіст"). Football 24. 25 April 2018

Sports venues completed in 1926
Football venues in Kharkiv Oblast
Sports venues built in the Soviet Union
Sport in Kharkiv
UEFA Euro 2012 stadiums in Ukraine
Buildings and structures in Kharkiv
FC Metalist Kharkiv
1926 establishments in Ukraine
Sports venues in Kharkiv Oblast
Slobidskyi District